Oudalan is one of the 45 provinces of Burkina Faso, located in its Sahel Region.
Its capital is Gorom-Gorom. The 2019 census reported 158,146 people living in the province.

Departments
The province is divided into 5 departments.

See also
Regions of Burkina Faso
Provinces of Burkina Faso
Departments of Burkina Faso

References

 
Provinces of Burkina Faso